Colin David Gibson (November 2, 1922 – July 3, 2002) was a  Canadian lawyer and politician.

Gibson was born into a political family.  He was the son of Colin W. G. Gibson, a prominent Liberal cabinet minister during World War II, and the grandson of John Morison Gibson, former Attorney General of Ontario.  He was educated at Upper Canada College.

On June 1, 1942 he enlisted in the Canadian army, stating a "desire to help the nation and defeat Hitler"   As a platoon commander with the rank of Lieutenant in the Royal Hamilton Light Infantry, he fought on D-Day and was wounded several days later.

After returning to civilian life he practised law.  In the 1968 federal election he was elected as a Liberal in the riding  of Hamilton—Wentworth.

He was defeated in the 1972 federal election by Progressive Conservative Sean O'Sullivan, who at 20 years old was the youngest MP ever elected to that point.

Gibson was married and had two children.

References

External links
 
 Biography from Veterans Affairs Canada

Members of the House of Commons of Canada from Ontario
Liberal Party of Canada MPs
1922 births
2002 deaths
Canadian Army personnel of World War II
Royal Hamilton Light Infantry (Wentworth Regiment) officers